Deh-e Borzu or Deh Borzu may refer to:
 Deh-e Borzu, Lorestan
 Deh-e Borzu, Razavi Khorasan